Noasaurus ("Northwestern Argentina lizard") is a genus of ceratosaurian theropod dinosaur genus from the late Campanian-Maastrichtian (Late Cretaceous) of Argentina. The type and only species is N. leali.

Discovery and naming
 
In the mid-seventies, a fragmentary small theropod skeleton was discovered by Jaime Eduardo Powell and José Fernando Bonaparte at the Estancia El Brete-site. In 1977, the discovery was reported in the scientific literature. The type species, Noasaurus leali, was named and described by Bonaparte and Powell in 1980. The generic name begins with a usual abbreviation of noroeste Argentina, "northwest Argentina". The specific name honours the owner of the site, Fidel Leal.

The holotype, PVL 4061, was found in a layer of the Lecho Formation of Salta Province, Argentina, dating from the late Cretaceous period, more precisely the early Maastrichtian stage, about seventy million years ago. It consists of a partial skeleton with skull. It contains the maxilla, the quadrate bone, two neck vertebrae, two neck ribs, the centrum of a back vertebra, two hand claws, a finger phalanx and the second right metatarsal bone. One of the hand claws was initially identified as a second toe claw. In 2004, it was recognised as a hand claw, at which occasion the second hand claw was referred.

In 1999, a neck vertebra found at the site, specimen MACM 622, was identified as oviraptorosaurian, a rare proof that the Oviraptorosauria had invaded the Gondwanan continents. In 2007 however, it was reidentified as a noasaurid vertebra, probably belonging to the Noasaurus holotype.

Description

Noasaurus was a small theropod. Gregory S.Paul estimated its length at 1.5 meters (5 ft), its weight at 15 kg (33 lbs). 

The maxilla bears at least eleven teeth. The teeth are recurved and have serrations at the front and rear edges.

The neck is probably long as the neck vertebrae are very elongated. These vertebrae are also strongly vertically compressed with a low neural spine and bear long epipophyses, a typical abelisauroid trait.

While originally reported to have a raptorial 'sickle claw' on the foot similar to the claws of the more advanced dromaeosaurids, subsequent studies showed that the claw actually came from the hand. The claw is exceptionally curved, has parallel base sides in top view, and possesses a deep triangular cavity at the base underside.

Classification
Noasaurus is today considered to be a member of the Ceratosauria. Originally, it was seen as a member of the Coelurosauria. Bonaparte and Powell assigned it to a family of its own, the Noasauridae. In 1988, Gregory S. Paul saw them as members of the Abelisauridae and coined a Noasaurinae within that group. He also incorrectly thought they were Megalosauria. Later, the noasaurids were recognised as close relatives of the larger abelisaurids; they are both derived from the same basal abelisauroid ancestor.

The following cladogram is based on the phylogenetic analysis conducted by Rauhut and Carrano in 2016, showing the relationships of Elaphrosaurus among the noasaurids:

Paleobiology

In 1980, it was thought that the presumed foot claw functioned as a sickle claw. Paul in 1988 saw the noasaurines as the South-American counterparts of the Asian and North-American dromaeosaurids, in a process of convergent evolution. Noting that abelisaurids tend to have very short arms, he wondered whether the forelimbs of Noasaurus were of limited length also, forcing the animal to employ a kicking technique instead of grasping the back of a victim in order to disembowel it with the foot claws, a method he assumed the dromaeosaurids used. This hypothesis was undermined when it was determined that the foot claw was in fact a hand claw.

In 2001, a more complete genus of noasaurid, Masiakasaurus was discovered. This genus had an unusual down-turned jaw and protruding front teeth which would have been well suited to grasping, and Masiakasaurus may have consumed small vertebrates, fish, or invertebrates. Noasaurus may have been similar in appearance and lifestyle.

See also

 Timeline of ceratosaur research

References

Sources
 

Abelisaurs
Late Cretaceous dinosaurs of South America
Fossil taxa described in 1980
Taxa named by José Bonaparte
Taxa named by Jaime Powell
Lecho Formation